Una Maid en Manhattan is a Spanish-language American telenovela produced by Telemundo Studios. It is based on the 2002 film Maid in Manhattan, starring Jennifer Lopez and Ralph Fiennes.

Plot
Una Maid in Manhattan tells the story of Marisa Luján (Litzy), who runs a small hotel in a village in Michoacan. Before the events shown in the show, she falls in love with Victor, an American man who visits Michoacán every year for the Christmas holidays. She becomes pregnant with Victor's child. She leaves Victor, after finding out he cheated, and moves with her son Lalo, to NY where she works as a maid in Manhattan hotel. She meet her Prince Charming Christobal Parker, Whom she fell in love with and their love was unconditional. Even if their love was unconditional they had obstacles which they conquered together. Sara, childhood friend of Christobal, who lusts for him and will do anything to get Christobal's love, and she may be a problem.

Cast and characters

Main
 Litzy as Merissa Luján
 Eugenio Siller as Cristóbal Parker Salas
 Vanessa Villela as Sara Montero
 Jorge Eduardo García as Eduardo "Lalo" Mendoza Luján

Recurring
 Shalim Ortiz as Frank Varela
 Maricela González as Calixta Meléndez
 Paulo Quevedo as Víctor Mendoza
 Tina Romero as Carmen Moreno "La Nana"
 Liz Gallardo as Leticia Robles "Leti"
 Ismael La Rosa as Tadeo Falcón "Tito"
 Jorge Baldini as Franco Rios
 Juan Pablo Llano as Bruno Rivera
 Karen Sentíes as Amelia Salas de Parker
 Fred Valle as Tyron Parker "Ty"
 Jorge Hernández as Estanislao "Polaco"
 Wanda D'Isidoro as Catalina Lucero
 Ana Sobero as Marcela Villa
 Sandra Eichler as Alicia
 Salim Rubiales as Tarek
 Maite Embil as Belinda Delgado
 Karina Mora as Yazmín "Yaya" Mendoza
 Xavier Coronel as Javier Serran
 Jeimy Osorio as Tania Taylor
 Rodrigo Mejía as Gregorio "Goyo"
 Aneudy Lara as Jerome Taylor
 Carlos Athié as Lucas Gonzalez
 Henry Zakka as Amador Colina
 Mónica Pasqualotto as Mireya Sanz
 Patricio Doren as Hugo Reyes
 Daniela Nieves as Alejandra Varela
 Fidel Pérez Michel as Richard Garcia
 Luke Grande as Dr. Martinez
 Khotan Fernández as Miguel Morales "Miguelito"
 Iván Hernández as Steve Martinez
 Liannet Borrego as Sylvia
 Ernesto Tapia as Ronnie
 Adela Romero as Gloria Mendoza
 Victor Corona as Esteban
 Osvaldo Strongoli as Teófilo "Teó"
 Sofia Sanabria as Vicky
 Samir Succar as Officer Conner
 Hely Ferrigny as Manuel Mendoza
 Lina Maya as Natasha
 Gualberto Gonzalez as Lazcano
 Lupillo Rivera as himself
 Carlos Cuervo as Joaquin
 Yami Quintero as Flavia Montes
 Hector Alejandro as Marcus
 Raúl Durán as Julius Thompson
 Duvier Poviones as Bob
 Catalina Mesa as Pilar
 Dayami Padron as Patricia
 Carlos Pítela as Don Serapio
 Omar Nassar as Benjamin Singer
 Raul Arrieta as Anselmo
 Gilbert Peralta as Memo
 Fernando Fermor as Tomás

Episodes

 Release dates, episode name & length, and U.S. viewers based on Telemundo's broadcast.

Production
Production and filming of Una Maid en Manhattan officially started in late 2011. From November 29, 2011 to July 9, 2012, Telemundo aired the serial weeknights at 8pm/7c, replacing Mi Corazón Insiste. From July 10 to 23, 2012, Telemundo aired half-hour episodes of Una Maid en Manhattan and Rosa Diamante, both sharing the 8pm/7c time slot. As with most of its other telenovelas, the network broadcast English subtitles with closed captions on CC3.

Reception
Telemundo's November 29 broadcast of Una Maid en Manhattan averaged nearly 1.6 million viewers. The series finale broadcast on July 23 averaged 2.1 million viewers, and became one of Telemundo’s strongest novelas ever during its run.

Awards and nominations

References

External links
 
 

2011 telenovelas
2012 telenovelas
2011 American television series debuts
2012 American television series endings
Sony Pictures Television telenovelas
Spanish-language American telenovelas
Telemundo telenovelas
Television shows set in Los Angeles
Television shows set in Miami
Television shows set in New York City
Works about immigration to the United States